Paul  Schrier II (born June 1, 1970) is an American actor, director, and artist. He is known for his role of Farkas "Bulk" Bulkmeier in the Power Rangers series. He portrayed the character for seven seasons from 1993–1999, returning in 2011 for the eighteenth season of Power Rangers Samurai, and was the last original cast member to leave the show. Schrier has also done some directing work, directing a few Power Rangers episodes, 16 episodes of the Hello Kitty animated series, and a short film, "An Easy Thing". He is also an artist, having worked on the comic book The Red Star. In 2017, he starred in his first animation voice role as Flonk in Cartoon Network's Mighty Magiswords.

Filmography

Anime roles
 Daigunder – Bone Rex
 Eagle Riders – Ollie Keeawani
 Teknoman – Teknoman Saber / Cain Carter

Live action / TV roles
 Mighty Morphin Power Rangers (1993-1996) – Farkas "Bulk" Bulkmeier (main role, credited) / Primator (voice, uncredited) / Bratboy (voice, uncredited)
 Mighty Morphin Power Rangers: Alpha's Magical Christmas - Farkas "Bulk" Bulkmeier (video short/archival footage)
 Masked Rider (1995) – Fire Bug (voice)
 Power Rangers Zeo (1996) – Farkas "Bulk" Bulkmeier
 Power Rangers Turbo (1997) – Farkas "Bulk" Bulkmeier (In the first half of PRT, Bulk was turned into a chimpanzee by Elgar. He was restored in the second half.)
 Power Rangers in Space (1998) – Farkas "Bulk" Bulkmeier
 Power Rangers Lost Galaxy (1999) – Farkas "Bulk" Bulkmeier (only appears in 4 episodes)
 Power Rangers: The Lost Episode (1999) - Farkas "Bulk" Bulkmeier (special episode/archival footage)
 Power Rangers Lightspeed Rescue (2000) – Infinitor (voice)
 Power Rangers Time Force (2001) – Severax (voice)
 Power Rangers Wild Force (2002) – Farkas "Bulk" Bulkmeier (Guest appearance)
 Mega64 (2006) – Paul Farkas (cameo)
 Power Rangers Samurai / Super Samurai (2011-2012) – Farkas "Bulk" Bulkmeier (main role)
 Power Rangers Hyperforce (2017) – Jack D. Thomas / Hyperforce Yellow Ranger – RPG web series

Animation
 Mighty Magiswords – Flonk

Movie roles
 Mighty Morphin Power Rangers: The Movie (1995) – Farkas "Bulk" Bulkmeier
 Turbo: A Power Rangers Movie (1997) – Farkas "Bulk" Bulkmeier
 Le zombi de Cap-Rouge (1997) – Billy Jack
 Wicked Game (2002) - Mom
 The Order (2017) – Varus

Additional notes
While the longest-serving cast member of the Power Rangers franchise, Paul's Farkas "Bulk" Bulkmeier was never an official Power Ranger himself. This was finally rectified during the 2017 web series Power Rangers Hyperforce where Schrier was made the team's yellow ranger. Though a web series rather than a television one, Hyperforce is considered canon by series creators Saban Entertainment, thus finally making Schrier a Ranger in his own right.

References

External links
 
 Paul Schrier on MySpace
 Paul Schrier's Twitter account

1970 births
20th-century American male actors
21st-century American male actors
American male comedians
21st-century American comedians
American male film actors
American male television actors
American male voice actors
Living people
Los Angeles Pierce College people
Male actors from Nevada
People from the Las Vegas Valley